Jeanine Tesori (known earlier in her career as Jeanine Levenson) is an American composer and musical arranger best known for her work in the theater. She is the most prolific and honored female theatrical composer in history, with five Broadway musicals and five Tony Award nominations. She won the 1999 Drama Desk Award for Outstanding Music in a Play for Nicholas Hytner's production of Twelfth Night at Lincoln Center, the 2004 Drama Desk Award for Outstanding Music for Caroline, or Change, and the 2015 Tony Award for Best Original Score for Fun Home (shared with Lisa Kron), making them the first female writing team to win that award. She was named a Pulitzer Prize for Drama finalist twice for Fun Home and Soft Power.

Her major works include Fun Home; Caroline, or Change; Shrek The Musical; Thoroughly Modern Millie; and Violet.

Early life and education

Tesori saw her first Off-Broadway production, Godspell at the Promenade, when she was fourteen. She said of the experience that she felt the sense of "I'm someplace where there's something happening, and I don't want to be anywhere else."

She attended Paul D. Schreiber High School in Port Washington, New York. She is a graduate of Barnard College, where she initially was pre-med but changed her major to music.

Career

Tesori made her Broadway debut when she arranged the dance music for the 1995 revival of How to Succeed in Business Without Really Trying. In 1997 she composed the score for the Off-Broadway musical Violet, for which she won an Obie Award, the New York Drama Critics Circle Award for Best Musical, and the Lucille Lortel Award for Outstanding Musical, and arranged the music for the Johnny Mercer revue Dream, which she repeated with the 1998 revival of The Sound of Music and the 1999 revue Swing! She also served as associate conductor for the Broadway productions of The Secret Garden and The Who's Tommy.

In 2000, Tesori joined forces with lyricist Dick Scanlan to write eleven new songs for a stage adaptation of Thoroughly Modern Millie. A successful run at the La Jolla Playhouse in San Diego resulted in a transfer to Broadway in 2002, and Tesori was nominated for the Tony Award for Best Original Score and the Drama Desk Award for Outstanding Music.

Tesori has collaborated with Tony Kushner four times. In 2004 she supplied music for the sung-through musical Caroline, or Change, which garnered her a third Tony nomination for Best Original Score. In 2006 she wrote incidental music for Kushner's new translation of Bertolt Brecht's Mother Courage and Her Children, which was produced as part of the 2006 Shakespeare in the Park season staged at the Delacorte Theater by The Public Theater. In the summer of 2011, their opera A Blizzard on Marblehead Neck premiered at Glimmerglass. In 2019, Tesori was credited as voice coach on the new Steven Spielberg film of West Side Story for which Kushner wrote the screenplay based largely on the original stage musical. Filmed over two months in and around New York City, the film saw its 2020 release rescheduled to December 2021 due to the COVID-19 pandemic.

Tesori has composed music for the films Nights in Rodanthe, The Loss of a Teardrop Diamond, The Little Mermaid: Ariel's Beginning, Shrek the Third, Mulan II, and The Emperor's New Groove 2: Kronk's New Groove.

Tesori wrote the music for Shrek The Musical, which opened on Broadway in 2008 and for which she earned both Tony and Drama Desk Award nominations for her music.

In 2011, she wrote the music to Fun Home with a book and lyrics by Lisa Kron, a musical based on the memoir by Alison Bechdel. The show was overseen by Philip Himberg while being workshopped at the Sundance Institute's 2011 Theatre Lab at White Oaks Lab in Yulee, Florida. It was previously developed during the 2009 Ojai Playwrights Conference. Fun Home opened Off-Broadway at The Public Theater on October 17, 2013, and sold out through November 4, 2013, with numerous extensions until it closed there on January 12, 2014. Here, it also won the 2014 Obie Award for Musical Theatre. Following the successful Off-Broadway run, the show transferred to Broadway at Circle in the Square Theatre, with previews beginning on March 27, 2015, and an official opening on April 19, 2015. Tesori and Kron won the Tony Award for Best Musical for Fun Home, marking the first time an all-female composing team won. The musical was named a 2014 Pulitzer Prize for Drama finalist.

Tesori was the artistic director of a concert series of Off-Broadway musicals, "Encores! Off-Center". The July 2013 season included The Cradle Will Rock, I'm Getting My Act Together and Taking It on the Road, and Violet. It was also in this role that Tesori recruited Jake Gyllenhaal to play Seymour in the 2015 Encores! production of Little Shop of Horrors.

Tesori's opera The Lion, The Unicorn, and Me premiered with the Washington National Opera at the Kennedy Center in December 2013. The libretto is by J. D. McClatchy, based on the children's book by Jeanette Winterson and was directed by Francesca Zambello.

The English version of three songs in the 2016 Tokyo DisneySea stage show Out of Shadowland were written by Tesori. They were sung in Japanese by pop singer Angela Aki.

With book and lyrics by David Henry Hwang, Tesori's new musical Soft Power began performances at the Ahmanson Theatre in Los Angeles in May 2018 and at San Francisco's Curran Theatre in June. The musical opened Off-Broadway at the Public Theater on September 14, 2019, directed by Leigh Silverman. The musical was named a 2020 Pulitzer Prize for Drama finalist.

In July 2019, she premiered her opera Blue, with libretto by Tazewell Thompson, at the Glimmerglass Festival in Cooperstown, New York. The opera concerns the issue of African American boys having become a prime target of police brutality in the United States.

In December of 2021, her new musical, Kimberly Akimbo, with book and lyrics by David Lindsay-Abaire opened at the Linda Gross Theater  in Manhattan. It won Best Musical at the Drama Desk Awards, Lucille Lortel Awards, and Outer Critics Circle Awards. It is scheduled to move to Broadway in fall 2022, with previews beginning on October 12, and an official opening on November 10.

Personal life
She lives with her husband, Michael Rafter, and their daughter, Siena, in Manhattan.

Stage

 Violet (1997)
 Twelfth Night (1998)
 Thoroughly Modern Millie (2000)
 Caroline, or Change (2003)
 Mother Courage and Her Children (2006)
 Shrek The Musical (2008)
 A Blizzard on Marblehead Neck (2011)
 Fun Home (2013)
 The Lion, The Unicorn, and Me (2013)
 Soft Power (2018)
 Blue (2019)
 Kimberly Akimbo (2021)

References

Further reading

External links

Internet Broadway Database

Working in the Theatre Seminar video at American Theatre Wing.org, April 2002
Working in the Theatre Seminar video at American Theatre Wing.org, April 2004

1961 births
20th-century American Jews
21st-century American Jews
American film score composers
American music arrangers
American musical theatre composers
American opera composers
American women film score composers
Animated film score composers
Barnard College alumni
Broadway composers and lyricists
Drama Desk Award winners
Jewish American film score composers
Jewish American songwriters
Jewish opera composers
Living people
New York Drama Critics' Circle Award winners
Songwriters from New York (state)
Tony Award winners
Women musical theatre composers
Women opera composers